Donald Lee Evans (born March 14, 1964, in Raleigh, North Carolina) is a former American football defensive end who played eight seasons in the National Football League (NFL) for the Los Angeles Rams, Philadelphia Eagles, Pittsburgh Steelers & New York Jets.

High school years 
Evans attended Athens Drive High School, where he played tailback and linebacker. He also participated and excelled in other sports and became a 3-Sport High School Standout Athlete participating in Football, Basketball (power forward) and Track (100m and 200m) sprint. 

After graduation, his #31 football jersey was retired, and he was inducted in the Athens Drive High School Sports Hall of Fame.

College tenure 
Following his outstanding athletic high school career, Evans accepted a football scholarship to be a student-athlete at Winston-Salem State University where he was coached by the legendary Coach William Bill Hayes. This prove to be a game changer; Evans became a 4-year standout football player/athlete. After playing several positions in college (halfback, tight end, & linebacker), Evans was moved to defensive end his senior year, he had 10 sacks and 65 tackles. 
A graduate of Winston-Salem State University, his alma mater honored him in the dedication and naming of the “Donald L. Evans Fitness Center”.

NFL career 
Donald played eight seasons in the National Football League. He played Running Back for the Los Angeles Rams (#34); Linebacker & Defensive End for the Philadelphia Eagles (#77); Defensive End for the Pittsburgh Steelers (#66); and Nose Tackle & Defensive Tackle for the New York Jets (#66). 

He played a total of 92 games during his NFL tenure; starting 84 games which equates to stats of starting 91.3% of games played during his impressive career.

Post NFL 
Donald is an astute businessman; he is the Founder and CEO of Nehemiah Builders, Inc which is a Consulting, Design-Build, Renovation and Demolition Company. A few of his business accolades are:

§  NCDOT - BOWD HUB Contractor of the Year

§  Hannah Keith Business/Entrepreneur of the Year

§  Benny Moore Unsung Heroes Businessman of the Year

§  The AME Church Bishop’s Business Award

Seven time Hall of Famer 
Evans is a Hall of Famer of the following organizations:

* WSSU Sports Hall of Fame      

* CIAA Sports Hall of Fame                                  

* Athens Drive Sports Hall of Fame  

* North Carolina Sports Hall of Fame 

* George Whitfield Baseball Clinic Hall of Fame              

* Ram Athletic Foundation Hall of Fame                  

* NC HBCU Living Legends Hall of Fame                 

* Black College Football Hall of Fame (finalist)

Philanthropy 
 
A generous philanthropist, Donald support numerous benevolent organizations and encourages others to do the same. The following are the some of the organizations he supports: 

¨     Various Youth, High School and College Athletic Programs

¨     Community and Church; Feed the Hungry and Charitable Community Programs

¨     End Slavery Now; {www.EndSlaveryNow.org}

¨     United Nations Foundation; {www.UNFoundation.org}

¨     Medical Benevolence Foundation (MBF); {www.MedicalMission.org}

¨     American Cancer Society; {www.Cancer.org}

¨     Alzheimer’s Association; {www.ALZ.org}

¨     American Heart Association; {www.Heart.org}

¨     Restoration Academy; {www.RestorationAcademy.org}

¨     American Society for the Prevention of Cruelty to Animals; {www.ASPCA.org}

¨     The V Foundation; {www.V.org}

References 
https://www.nehemiahbuilders.com/about-us
https://www.newsobserver.com/sports/high-school/article173544606.html
https://www.billhayes.org/#TRAINERS
https://hbcugameday.com/2021/12/01/black-college-football-hall-of-fame-2022-finalists/
https://www.upi.com/Archives/1994/03/14/Donald-Evans-signs-with-Jets/7665763621200/
https://journalnow.com/sports/college/ram-ramblings-donald-evans-heading-to-ciaa-hall-of-fame/article_f3fe8950-17a9-5a99-9470-8f62eb53dbfa.html
https://www.wssurams.com/about/hall_of_fame/Hall_of_Fame_Bios/Donal_Evans_Bio
https://www.espn.com/nfl/player/bio/_/id/7039/donald-evans
https://www.footballoutsiders.com/player/21131/donald-evans
https://www.profootballarchives.com/playere/evan01800.html

https://ncshof.org/news-events/

https://www.ramathleticfoundation.org/ram-hof

1964 births
Living people
Players of American football from Raleigh, North Carolina
American football defensive ends
American football defensive tackles
Athens Drive High School alumni
Winston-Salem State Rams football players
Los Angeles Rams players
Philadelphia Eagles players
Pittsburgh Steelers players
New York Jets players